Alina Henadzeuna Talay (born 14 May 1989) is a Belarusian track and field athlete who specialises in the 100 metres hurdles.

Career
She was fourth in the event at the 2008 World Junior Championships in Athletics and won the bronze medal at the 2009 European Athletics U23 Championships a year after. Talay began competing in the senior ranks in 2009 and was a semi-finalist in the 60 metres hurdles at the 2009 European Athletics Indoor Championships. She dipped under 13 seconds for the 100 m hurdles for the first time in 2010 and ended the year having a personal best of 12.87 seconds. That year she was a semi-finalist at both the 2010 IAAF World Indoor Championships and the 2010 European Athletics Championships.

Talay ran a best of 7.95 seconds for the 60 m hurdles at the 2011 European Athletics Indoor Championships and came fifth overall, making her first championship final. Still eligible for the age category competitions, she won at the 2011 European Athletics U23 Championships. She missed the World Championships, but competed at the 2011 Military World Games and won in a games record time of 12.95 seconds. She claimed her first world medal at the 2012 IAAF World Indoor Championships, taking the bronze. At the 2012 Summer Olympics, she raced in the 100 m hurdles and the  relay. At the 2016 Olympics, she competed in the 100 m hurdles only.

Her personal bests are 12.41 seconds in the 100 metres hurdles (0.5 m/s, St. Polten 2018) and 7.85 seconds in the 60 metres hurdles (Prague 2015).

International competitions

1Disqualified in the final

Personal bests 
100 m hurdles: 12.41 (May 2018) NR
60 m hurdles: 7.85 (March 2015) NR
50 m hurdles: 6.89 (December 2011) NR

References

External links

1989 births
Living people
Belarusian female hurdlers
People from Orsha
Athletes (track and field) at the 2012 Summer Olympics
Athletes (track and field) at the 2016 Summer Olympics
Olympic athletes of Belarus
European Athletics Championships medalists
World Athletics Championships athletes for Belarus
World Athletics Championships medalists
Universiade medalists in athletics (track and field)
Universiade silver medalists for Belarus
Medalists at the 2013 Summer Universiade
Sportspeople from Vitebsk Region